The Estonian Basketball Player of the Year is an annual award given to the best performing Estonian basketball player of the respective season. From 1995 to 2001 the award was decided by a poll of Estonian sports journalists and given by the magazine Sporditäht. Until 1999, only players who played for a domestic club were eligible for the award. In 2001, players who represented the Estonian national team were added to the vote. Since 2004, the award has been presented by the Estonian Basketball Association. The current holder of the award is Siim-Sander Vene.

Winners

Multiple-time winners

References

Basketball in Estonia
Awards established in 1995
Estonian sports trophies and awards
Lists of Estonian sportspeople